Lars Erik Högberg (18 December 1858 – 1924) was a missionary and linguist in Russia and Chinese Turkestan (present day Xinjiang). He served with the Mission Union of Sweden.

He first served in Russia in August 1880, and went to Chinese Turkestan first on May 3, 1894.

His first wife, Eva Eriksson, whom he married August 15, 1882, died August 3, 1892 of cholera in Tabris, Persia. On 26 March 1894 he married a second time to Sigrid Johanna Adelaide Braune.

Bibliography
Högberg, L. E., Ett och annat från Kinesiska Turkestan, Stockholm: Svenska missionsförbundet, 1907
Högberg, L. E., Jolbas. En kaschgargosses levnad skildrad av honom själv, Stockholm 1913, 2. ed. 1918.
Högberg, L. E., The Way of Life in turkish, Kashgar S M S Mission Press 1914
Högberg, L. E., Läkaremissionen i Kaschgar 1905, in Hälsovännen N:o 13, 1 Juli 1917  - Läkaremission: I.
Högberg, L. E., Ruts besök i Ost-Turkestan, Stockholm 1919.
Högberg, L. E., När man börjar. Några erfarenheter vid uppförande av en ny missionsstation i Ost-Turkestan, Stockholm 1919
Högberg, L. E., Bland Persiens Muhammedaner: minnen och hågkomster från Svenska missionsförbundets arbete i Persien, Stockholm : Svenska missionsförbundet, 1920.
Högberg, L. E., Kultur-och missionsarbete: Ost-Turkestan, Göteborg: Wald. Zachrissons Boktryckeri A.-B., 1925.
Högberg, L. E., Islam och evangeliet; muhammedanmissionens vänner..., Stockholm, Svenska missionsförbundets förlag [1925]

Swedish Protestant missionaries
Protestant missionaries in China
Christian missionaries in Central Asia
1858 births
1924 deaths
Translators of the Bible into Uyghur
Protestant missionaries in Russia
Swedish expatriates in China
Swedish expatriates in Russia
Missionary linguists